The Georgia women's football championship  is contested in the top level women's football league in Georgia. The league ran until 2010 and was for a time defunct, in 2014 an attempt was made to restore the championship in the form of a cup tournament. In 2015, no tournament was held, but competition resumed in 2016.

History
In 2004 a league was established. It ran for six years in the form of mini-tournaments. It was eventually disbanded for monetary reasons and limited player numbers.
The number of teams varied from year to year. In 2008 there were 4 teams, 7 in 2009 and 5 in 2010.

Renewed interest in women's football lead to a new improved league 2014. After years of hiatus a national championship was played in cup style in August 2014.

The current iteration of the Georgian National Women’s Football Championship began on 26 April 2016. Six teams contest the title: Iveria (Khashuri), 35th Football School (Tbilisi), WFC Lanchkhuti, Hereti (Lagodekhi), Martve (Kutaisi), and WFC Adjara. The teams now play two rounds of games which determine the country’s strongest women’s football club. The 2016 season ended on 28 October.

Champions
 1990: Medical School No. 3 Tbilisi
 1997: Avaza Tbilisi
 2004-05: ?
 2005-06: ?
 2006-07: Dinamo Tbilisi
 2007-08: FC Iveria Khashuri
 2008-09: WFC Kobuleti
 2009-10: FC Baia Zugdidi
2014: Iberia Star Tbilisi
2016: WFC Martve
2017 WFC Martve
2018: FC Tbilisi Nike 
2019: WFC Lanchkhuti 
2020: FC Tbilisi Nike
2021: WFC Lanchkhuti
2022: FC Samegrelo Chkorotsku

References

External links
Official site (Georgian)
2016 season fixtures, results, standings

women
Top level women's association football leagues in Europe
Women's football in Georgia (country)
Women's sports leagues in Georgia (country)